Rutherford is an unincorporated community within Ritchie County, West Virginia, United States. Its post office has been closed.

References

Unincorporated communities in Ritchie County, West Virginia
Unincorporated communities in West Virginia